Aulonemia purpurata is a species of the bamboo genus Aulonemia.

It is part of the grass family and endemic to Latin America.

References

purpurata